Terran Jerrell Gilbert (born December 7, 1984), known mononymously as T-RAN, is an American singer, songwriter, record producer, musician, philanthropist, music video director, motivational speaker, entrepreneur and actor from Chattanooga, Tennessee.  T-RAN currently operates and resides in Chattanooga, Tennessee. He is the founder of the entertainment company, 22Visionz, LLC. His debut album, Live And Not Die, has received airplay worldwide on television, radio and internet.

Early life
T-RAN was born December 7, 1984, in Chattanooga, Tennessee. His father, Russell Gilbert Sr., is an elected official and hospital director. His mother, Terri Gilbert, works with children at the 22V Kids Academy and disadvantaged youth. T-RAN has three sisters: Skieree and twins Gabrielle and Whitney; and one brother, Russell Jr. He had an older sister, Sherree, who died at birth.

He began singing and dancing at the age of three, mimicking his musical idol, Michael Jackson. T-RAN picked up his first microphone at the age of four. His grandfather was a Baptist preacher and his grandmother was a church pianist. He credits his grandfather as the first to call him, "T-RAN," as a way of helping people pronounce his first name.

Secular and gospel music were the source for T-RAN's motivation as a singer by age 9. T-RAN joined the youth church choir at a local church at age 12. He became music director by the age of 13. That same year, he showcased his talent at a regional Gospel Star Search. It was during this time that he decided to sing professionally. By age 14, he appeared for the first time on television on The Babbie Mason Show.

When he was 15, T-RAN wrote his first song, "Miracles." It was written as a testimony to God for delivering his older brother, Russell Jr., from a life-threatening illness.

T-RAN attended the Chattanooga High School Center for Creative Arts from 1999 to 2002 and studied under Alan Ledford in a theatrical music troupe called The Choo Choo Kids. Under Alan's direction, T-RAN honed his performance skills and stage presence. In 2001, he toured with the troupe in Europe.

College years

T-RAN earned a Bachelor of Science degree in Telecommunications from Lee University, a Christian liberal arts college in Cleveland, Tennessee, where he attended from 2003 to 2007. He toured in Jamaica and The Bahamas in 2006.

In 2008, T-RAN licensed his company, 22Visionz, LLC. The name, 22Visionz, is derived from Proverbs 22:1 of the Bible: “A good name is rather to be chosen than great riches, and loving favor rather than silver and gold.”

In 2008, his father ran for a seat on the Chattanooga City Council in a special election and won. T-RAN worked as campaign manager for his father's campaign in 2008 and re-election campaigns in 2009 and 2013.

Professional career

T-RAN's earliest large venue performance took place at the SEC women's basketball tournament in 1999 at the University of Tennessee at Chattanooga arena, where he sang the national anthem. He also sang background for Shania Twain at the same venue in 2000 for her performance of the song, "God Bless the Child." Shania sent a letter to T-RAN thanking him for backing her.

In 2009, he headlined one of the largest stages during prime time at the annual Riverbend Festival in Chattanooga. He has also performed at the annual J-Fest Christian music festival.

T-RAN has shared stages with many national and international artists: Monica, Chrisette Michele, Kirk Franklin, Chris Tomlin, Toby Mac, Steven Curtis Chapman, Casting Crowns, Natalie Grant, Bishop Paul Morton Sr., Da T.R.U.T.H., Anthony Hamilton, Coco Jones, Freddy Jackson, Bobby Rush, Pettidee, Lyfe Jennings, Gorilla Zoe and Kool & The Gang.

He toured in 2013 with gospel artist Canton Jones on the KB4 Tour. He hosted and headlined the "Culture Shock" concert in Chattanooga in 2010 and 2011.

T-RAN released his Live And Not Die EP in 2013 on the strength of the first single, "Need You Now," written and produced by T-RAN, co-produced by James Matchack. The video for the song, released on January 25, 2012, had over 1.4 million views on YouTube. In 2015, the song was featured in the TV One movie, For The Love of Ruth. That year, T-RAN headlined the Live And Not Die Tour.

T-RAN recorded the Hip Hop song, "Turn The Lights On," with Teron Carter of the Grammy Award-nominated group, G.R.I.T.S. In 2012, T-RAN was the featured artist on the song, "I Believe," by The Voice contestant Sera Hill. He went on a media tour with Sera in Tennessee and Georgia in promotion of the song.

In 2012, he went on a media tour in California that included performances at the 6th Annual Million Mothers March in Pomona, California. In 2013, he played at the legendary WitZend club in Los Angeles.

In 2014, T-RAN headlined the Live And Not Die concert at one of Nashville's largest music venues, 12th & Porter, with Disney sensation Coco Jones.

In 2015, T-RAN performed for gospel legend Babbie Mason on the Babbie's House show. He was also a guest lecturer at Babbie Mason's Inner Circle master class for singers and songwriters.

The Imprint

T-RAN has released three singles ("Breathe," "Nowhere," and "Lord Make Me Over") from his unreleased full-length album, The Imprint. The video for "Breathe" was released on September 18, 2015, and tells the story of a man trying to save his marriage. The video for "Nowhere," released on January 8, 2016, tells the story of a woman who has escaped from the perils of human trafficking.
T-RAN also worked with Nashville producer OGTha3 in the co-production of the songs, "Breathe," and "Nowhere."

Endorsement
In 2015, T-RAN was endorsed by the company, Alclair. which manufactures custom in-ear monitors.

Philanthropy

In 2012, T-RAN took his music and motivational speaking on the "Season of Non-Violence Tour," with Dr. Arun Gandhi, grandson of Mahatma Gandhi. He also performed a benefit concert in 2012 with gospel artist Gordon Mote.

In 2014, T-RAN headlined a celebrity benefit concert in Los Angeles for Homeboys Industries, benefiting programs for gang-involved and previously-incarcerated men and women. He also partnered with international agency, Feed the Children.

In 2014, T-RAN sponsored a benefit concert for the Nashville-based nonprofit, Nashville Peacemakers, an organization fighting against human trafficking, youth violence and illiteracy. He also performed at the IndieCares Concert Series sponsored by Nashville Inner City Ministries benefiting needy families.

In 2016, T-RAN teamed up with Unchained Movement and Nashville Peacemakers in promoting human trafficking awareness with the use of his video, "Nowhere."

International Music and Touring

In 2010, T-RAN toured in Mongolia and China with music from his Live And Not Die tour. Music from his EP played on Beijing radio.

In 2010, T-RAN began working with Polish rapper and music producer DJ Yonas, who enlisted T-RAN for his work with Polish rap group, Rymcerze. T-RAN sang on Rymcerze's Z3RO Strachu album, on the track "Pokuta." He appeared on DJ Yonas's 2011 mixtape, Hard 4 Christ. He also sang on DJ Yonas's 2014 single, "Zimny Świat," (Cold World), that also featured rapper Bęsiu.

Awards and honors

In 2011, T-RAN was honored with a proclamation for professional achievement from the State of Tennessee's House of Legislatures and the Key to the City by the City of Chattanooga.

Discography

EPs

Albums
The Imprint (2016)

Singles

Filmography

Film

Television

Music Videos

References

1984 births
American entertainers
American gospel singers
Living people
Singers from Tennessee
21st-century American singers
21st-century American male singers